In the United States, the Peninsula District is a district of the Virginia High School League.  It consists of public high schools in the cities of Hampton and Newport News, plus Gloucester High School in Gloucester County.

Schools in the Peninsula District compete in the 6A, 5A, and 4A divisions.

Schools in the Peninsula District

Gloucester County
Gloucester High School, 5A

Hampton
Bethel High School, 5A
Hampton High School, 5A
Kecoughtan High School, 5A
Phoebus High School, 3A

Newport News
Denbigh High School, 4A
Heritage High School, 4A
Menchville High School, 5A
Warwick High School, 5A
Woodside High School, 6A

Former members
Homer L. Ferguson High School of Newport News, Virginia (school closed in 1996)
Lafayette High School of Williamsburg, Virginia (now in the AA Bay Rivers District)
Newport News High School of Newport News, Virginia (school became Newport News Intermediate School, which eventually closed in 1980)
Tabb High School of Tabb, Virginia (now in the AA Bay Rivers District)
James Blair High School (Williamsburg, Virginia) 1967 - 1973 (school became a middle school in 1973)
York High School (Yorktown, Virginia) (now in the AA Bay Rivers District)

References 

Education in Gloucester County, Virginia
Education in Hampton, Virginia
Sports in Hampton Roads
Virginia High School League
Sports in Newport News, Virginia